The 2011 NCAA Division I women's basketball tournament began on March 19, 2011 and concluded on April 5, 2011. The Texas A&M Aggies won the championship, defeating the Notre Dame Fighting Irish 76–70 in the final held at Conseco Fieldhouse in Indianapolis.

The tournament was also notable for a historic run by Gonzaga that ultimately ended in the final of the Spokane Region. With the help of two games on their home court and a regional held less than two miles away, the #11-seeded Bulldogs became the lowest seed ever to make a regional final in the history of the women's tournament.

Tournament procedure

	
Pending any changes to the format, a total of 64 teams will enter the 2011 tournament. 32 automatic bids shall be awarded to each program that wins their conference's tournament. The remaining 36 bids are "at-large", with selections extended by the NCAA Selection Committee. The tournament is split into four regional tournaments, and each regional has teams seeded from 1 to 16, with the committee ostensibly making every region as comparable to the others as possible. The top-seeded team in each region plays the #16 team, the #2 team plays the #15, etc. (meaning where the two seeds add up to 17, that team will be assigned to play another).

The basis for the subregionals returned to the approach used between 1982 and 2002; the top sixteen teams, as chosen in the bracket selection process, hosted the first two rounds on campus.

The Selection Committee will also seed the entire field from 1 to 64.

2011 NCAA Tournament schedule and venues 
There were 64 teams in the tournament, placed in a seeded bracket with four regions. Thirty-two teams received automatic bids – thirty-one of which were their conference tournament champions; the other was for the Ivy League regular-season champion.  An additional 32 teams were given at-large bids by the selection committee on the basis of their body of work during the regular season.  Unlike the Men's Tournament, there was no "First Four" round. 

First and Second rounds (Subregionals)

Subregionals were played from March 19 through March 22.

The following 16 sites were used for first and second-round games:
The Pit, University of New Mexico, Albuquerque, New Mexico
Auburn Arena, Auburn University, Auburn, Alabama
John Paul Jones Arena, University of Virginia, Charlottesville, Virginia
Cintas Center, Xavier University, Cincinnati, Ohio
Comcast Center, University of Maryland, College Park, College Park, Maryland
St. John Arena, Ohio State University, Columbus, Ohio
Cameron Indoor Stadium, Duke University, Durham, North Carolina
Thompson-Boling Arena, University of Tennessee, Knoxville, Tennessee
Jon M. Huntsman Center, University of Utah, Salt Lake City, Utah
McCarthey Athletic Center, Gonzaga University, Spokane, Washington
CenturyTel Center, Bossier City, Louisiana (Host: Louisiana Tech University)
Maples Pavilion, Stanford University, Palo Alto, California
Harry A. Gampel Pavilion, University of Connecticut, Storrs, Connecticut
Bryce Jordan Center, Pennsylvania State University, University Park, Pennsylvania
Ferrell Center, Baylor University, Waco, Texas
INTRUST Bank Arena, Wichita, Kansas (Host: Wichita State University)

Regional semifinals and finals (Sweet Sixteen and Elite Eight)

The Regionals, named for the city rather than the region of geographic importance since 2005, which were held from March 26 to March 29, were at these sites:

Dayton Regional, University of Dayton Arena, Dayton, Ohio
Spokane Regional, Spokane Veterans Memorial Arena, Spokane, Washington (Host: Washington State University)
Dallas Regional, American Airlines Center, Dallas, Texas (Host Big 12 Conference)
Philadelphia Regional, Liacouras Center, Temple University, Philadelphia, Pennsylvania
NOTES: 1. Unless noted, all sites are on campus.2. This marked the first time since the NCAA started pre-determining subregional sites that one city hosted both a sub-regional and regional final as Spokane served as a host city twice in the same tournament.

National semifinals and championship (Final Four and national championship)
April 3 and 5
Bankers Life Fieldhouse, Indianapolis, Indiana (Hosts: Horizon League and Indiana University – Purdue University Indianapolis)

This was the second time that Indianapolis hosted a Women's Final Four Basketball tournament; the prior times were in 2005 as per the NCAA's policy of hosting one of each of the men's and women's Final Four every five years in the home city of the NCAA offices.

Tournament records
 Field goals—Maya Moore attempted 30 field goals in the semifinal against Notre Dame, the most ever attempted in a Final Four game.
 Free throws—Texas A&M completed ten out of ten free throw attempts, tied for the highest percentage free throw shooting by a team in an NCAA Tournament game (minimum-nine attempts).
 Free throws—Marquette  completed zero free throws in a game against Texas, tied for the fewest free throws completed in an NCAA Tournament game.
 Field goals—Nicole Griffin, Oklahoma, hit 15 of 19 Field goal attempts, the highest field goal completion percentage for an individual in an NCAA Tournament.

Qualifying teams – automatic

Sixty-four teams were selected to participate in the 2011 NCAA Tournament. Thirty-one conferences were eligible for an automatic bid to the 2011 NCAA tournament. Tennessee continues its record of being present at every NCAA Tournament since the NCAA began sanctioning women's sports in the 1981–82 school year.

Qualifying teams – at-large
Thirty-three additional teams were selected to complete the sixty-four invitations.

Tournament seeds

Bids by conference
Thirty-one conferences earned an automatic bid.  In twenty-one cases, the automatic bid was the only representative from the conference. Thirty-three additional at-large teams were selected from ten of the conferences.

Bids by state

The sixty-four teams came from thirty states, plus Washington, D.C. Texas had the most teams with six bids. Twenty states did not have any teams receiving bids.

Brackets
* – Denotes overtime period
Unless otherwise noted, all times listed are Eastern Daylight Time (UTC-04)

Philadelphia Region

Dayton Region

Spokane Region

Dallas Region

Final Four – Indianapolis, Indiana

Record by conference

Eighteen conferences went 0–1: the America East, Atlantic Sun, Big Sky, Big South, Big West, Colonial, Ivy League, MEAC, MAC, Missouri Valley, Mountain West, Northeast, Ohio Valley, Patriot, Southern, Southland, SWAC and the Summit

All-Tournament team

 Danielle Adams, Texas A&M
 Skylar Diggins, Notre Dame
 Maya Moore, Connecticut
 Tyra White, Texas A&M
 Devereaux Peters, Notre Dame

Game officials

 Lisa Jones (semifinal)
 Felicia Grinter (semifinal)
 Denise Brooks (semifinal)
 Lisa Mattingly (semifinal)
 Cameron Inouye (semifinal)
 Susan Blauch (semifinal)
 Dee Kantner  (final)
 Tina Napier (final)
 Michael Price (final)

Media coverage

Television
ESPN had US television rights to all games during the tournament. For the first and second round, ESPN aired select games nationally on ESPN or ESPNU. All other games were aired regionally on ESPN2 and streamed online via ESPN3. Most of the nation got whip-a-round coverage during this time, which allowed ESPN to rotate between the games and focus the nation on the one that was the closest. The regional semifinals were split between ESPN and ESPN2, and ESPN aired the regional finals, national semifinals, and championship match.

Studio host & analysts
Trey Wingo (Host)
Kara Lawson (Analyst)
Carolyn Peck (Analyst)

Commentary teams

First & Second Rounds Saturday/Monday
Jon Sciambi & Stephen Bardo – Columbus, OH
Dave Flemming & Kayte Christensen – Durham, NC
Dave O'Brien & Debbie Antonelli – Knoxville, TN
Justin Kutcher & Brenda VanLengen – University Park, PA
Clay Matvick & Tamika Raymond – Albuquerque, NM
Holly Rowe & Sean Farnham – Salt Lake City, UT
Marc Kestecher & Krista Blunk – Spokane, WA
Dave Pasch & Mary Murphy – Stanford, CA
Sweet Sixteen & Elite Eight Saturday/Monday
Dave Flemming, Rebecca Lobo, & Todd Harris – Dayton, OH
Dave Pasch, Debbie Antonelli, & Heather Cox – Spokane, WA
Final Four
Dave O'Brien, Doris Burke, Rebecca Lobo, & Holly Rowe – Indianapolis, IN

First & Second Rounds Sunday/Tuesday
Beth Mowins & Rosalyn Gold-Onwude – Charlottesville, VA
Bob Wischusen & Brooke Weisbrod – Cincinnati, OH
Bob Picozzi & Rebecca Lobo – College Park, MD
Mark Jones & Doris Burke – Storrs, CT
Cara Capuano & LaChina Robinson – Auburn, AL
Carter Blackburn & Fran Fraschilla – Shreveport, LA
Pam Ward & Stephanie White – Waco, TX
Dan McLaughlin & Abby Waner – Wichita, KS
Sweet Sixteen & Elite Eight Sunday/Tuesday
Dave O'Brien, Doris Burke, & Holly Rowe – Philadelphia, PA
Pam Ward, Stephanie White, & Beth Mowins – Dallas, TX
Championship
Dave O'Brien, Doris Burke, Rebecca Lobo, & Holly Rowe – Indianapolis, IN

See also
 NCAA Women's Division I Basketball Championship
 2011 NCAA Women's Division II basketball tournament
 2011 Women's National Invitation Tournament
 2011 Women's Basketball Invitational
 2011 NCAA Division I men's basketball tournament
 2011 NAIA Division I men's basketball tournament
 2011 NAIA Division II men's basketball tournament

References

External links
 NCAA Division I Women's Basketball

NCAA Division I women's basketball tournament
 
NCAA Division I women's basketball tournament
NCAA Division I women's basketball tournament
NCAA
Basketball in the Dallas–Fort Worth metroplex
Basketball in Waco, Texas